Latvia competed at the 2018 Winter Olympics in Pyeongchang, South Korea, from 9 to 25 February 2018, with 34 competitors in 9 sports. They won one bronze medal in two-man bobsleigh and ranked 28th in the medal table.

Medalists

Competitors
The following is the list of number of competitors participating at the Games per sport/discipline.

Alpine skiing

Biathlon 

Based on their Nations Cup ranking in the 2016–17 Biathlon World Cup, Latvia has qualified 2 men, and 1 woman.

Bobsleigh 

Based on their rankings in the 2017–18 Bobsleigh World Cup, Latvia has qualified 4 sleds.

 Intars Dambis (reserve man)

* – Denotes the driver of each sled

Cross-country skiing 

Distance

Sprint

Figure skating 

Latvia has qualified one male and female figure skater, based on its placement at the 2017 World Figure Skating Championships in Helsinki, Finland.

Individual

Luge 

Based on the results from the World Cups during the 2017–18 Luge World Cup season, Latvia qualified 8 sleds. 

Men

Women

Mixed team relay

Short track speed skating 

Latvia has qualified two skaters for men's events for the Olympics during the four World Cup events in November 2017.

Qualification legend: ADV – Advanced due to being impeded by another skater; FA – Qualify to medal round; FB – Qualify to consolation round; AA – Advance to medal round due to being impeded by another skater

Skeleton 

Based on the world rankings, Latvia qualified 3 sleds. Martins Dukurs, the sports' most decorated athlete, had previously meddled in Vancouver and Sochi. He was a favorite to win a medal in pyeongchang but fell short.  Originally both Martins and Tomass had announced plans to retire following the 2018 Olympics, but after failing to secure a medal in pyeongchang reversed their decision.

Speed skating 

Individual

Mass start

References

Nations at the 2018 Winter Olympics
2018
Winter Olympics